Jen Day (born July 28, 1981) is an American politician and weightlifter. She is a member of the Nebraska Legislature.

Day became an activist in 2010, advocating for public education among other topics. She participated in the IFW World Masters Championship weightlifting competition in 2016, finishing in 7th place.

She ran for a seat in the state's unicameral legislature in 2020, defeating incumbent Andrew La Grone. The race was marked by an incident in which La Grone's campaign mailed an attack ad flier to voters with a misidentified photograph  the flyer featured a volunteer on Day's campaign mislabeled as Day herself. Day assumed office in January 2021 representing the 49th district.

As a member of the legislature's education committee, Day has advocated for school epilepsy safety and for freedom of the press for high school student newspapers.

She supports legal abortion, saying "the Nebraska Legislature must reject medically unnecessary restrictions on abortion."

Day is a business owner and fitness coach. She is married to Jonathan Day; they have two children. Since 2016 Day has been president of the Nebraska Local Weightlifting Committee.

References

Living people
1981 births
Politicians from Omaha, Nebraska
University of Nebraska Omaha alumni
Democratic Party Nebraska state senators
American female weightlifters
21st-century American politicians
21st-century American women politicians
People from Council Bluffs, Iowa